Bdellidae is a family of snout mites in the order Trombidiformes. There are about 11 genera and at least 260 described species in Bdellidae.

In terms of size, they are medium to large-sized predatory mites. They are known to inhabit soil, leaves, as well as intertidal rocks. They can be easily recognized by their elongated, snout-like gnathosoma pedipalps bearing two (one in Monotrichobdella) long terminal setae.

Genera
 Bdella Latreille, 1795
 Biscirus Thor, 1913
 Cyta von Heyden, 1826
 Hexabdella van Der Schyff, Theron & Ueckermann, 2004
 Monotrichobdella Baker & Balock, 1944
 Neomolgus Oudemans, 1937
 Odontoscirus Thor, 1913
 Polytrichus van Der Schyff, Theron & Ueckermann, 2003
 Spinibdella Thor, 1930
 Tetrabdella Hernandes & Feres, 2006
 Trachymolgus Berlese, 1923

Gallery

References

Further reading

 
 
 
 
 

Trombidiformes
Acari families